Yuri Cheslavavich Hulitski (born 18 April 1996) is a retired Belarusian competitive ice dancer. With Anna Kublikova, he is the 2018 Open d'Andorra silver medalist and the 2019 Belarusian national champion. He has competed in the final segment at three ISU Championships.

Career 
Hulitski began learning to skate in 2000. He competed at least five seasons with Eugenia Tkachenka. At the 2012 Winter Youth Olympics, the two placed 10th in the individual ice dancing event and won gold in the team event. At the 2015 World Junior Championships in Tallinn, Estonia, they qualified to the free dance and finished 17th overall.

Hulitski and Russia's Maria Oleynik made their international debut in August 2015. Their final event together was the 2016 World Junior Championships, held in March in Debrecen, Hungary. They placed 16th in the short dance, 18th in the free dance, and 17th overall.

Hulitski and Kristsina Kaunatskaia from Belarus debuted their partnership in September 2016, at the ISU Junior Grand Prix in Japan. After another JGP event, in Germany, they switched to the senior ranks, taking silver at the Belarusian Championships in December. In February, they placed 14th at the 2017 Winter Universiade, their final competition together.

Hulitski then teamed up with Russia's Anna Kublikova. Making their international debut, they placed 12th at the 2017 CS Minsk-Arena Ice Star in October. In December 2018, they took silver at the Open d'Andorra. In January, they competed at the 2019 European Championships in Minsk, Belarus. They qualified to the free dance and finished 18th overall. They placed 22nd at the 2019 World Championships in Saitama, Japan.

In August 2019, the pair split as Kublikova retired.

Programs

With Kaunatskaia

With Oleynik

With Tkachenka

Competitive highlights 
CS: Challenger Series; JGP: Junior Grand Prix

With Kublikova

With Kaunatskaia

With Oleynik

With Tkachenka

References

External links 

 
 

1996 births
Belarusian male ice dancers
Living people
Figure skaters from Minsk
Figure skaters at the 2012 Winter Youth Olympics
Competitors at the 2017 Winter Universiade
20th-century Belarusian people
21st-century Belarusian people